John Ira Bailey,  (born August 10, 1942) is an American cinematographer and film director known for his collaborations with directors Paul Schrader, Lawrence Kasdan, Michael Apted, and Ken Kwapis. In August 2017, Bailey was elected president of the Academy of Motion Picture Arts and Sciences. He was succeeded by casting director David Rubin in August 2019.

Early life
John Ira Bailey was born August 10, 1942, in Moberly, Missouri, and raised in Norwalk, California. He attended Pius X High School in Downey, California, and briefly studied chemistry at Santa Clara University before transferring to Loyola University, Los Angeles, where he graduated with a bachelor's degree in 1964. He earned a graduate degree from the University of Southern California School of Cinematic Arts (SCA) in 1968.

Career
Bailey spent 11 years apprenticing as a crew member with cinematographers such as Vilmos Zsigmond and Néstor Almendros, working on Two-Lane Blacktop, The Late Show, 3 Women, Winter Kills, and Days of Heaven. He earned his first credit as director of photography for Boulevard Nights, followed by Ordinary People and American Gigolo.

In 1985, Bailey shared the Cannes Film Festival Best Artistic Contribution Award with Eiko Ishioka and Philip Glass for Mishima: A Life in Four Chapters. He was nominated for the Independent Spirit Award for Best Cinematography for Tough Guys Don't Dance and the Camerimage Golden Frog Award for Best Cinematography for Forever Mine. He is a member of the American Society of Cinematographers and member of the jury at the Venice Film Festival in 1987. He worked on numerous comedy films such as Groundhog Day, As Good as It Gets, and The Producers. He is a veteran documentary cameraman.

Bailey's credits as a director include The Search for Signs of Intelligent Life in the Universe, China Moon, Mariette in Ecstasy, and Via Dolorosa.

He has been married to film editor Carol Littleton since 1972. They reside in Los Angeles.

Filmography

As director of photography

As director 
 The Search for Signs of Intelligent Life in the Universe (1991)
 China Moon (1994)
 Mariette in Ecstasy (1996)
 Via Dolorosa (2000) (stage play)
 NSync: Bigger Than Live (2001) (short film)

Awards and nominations

References

External links 
 

1942 births
American cinematographers
Living people
People from Moberly, Missouri
Presidents of the Academy of Motion Picture Arts and Sciences
Loyola Marymount University alumni
Santa Clara University alumni
USC School of Cinematic Arts alumni
Film directors from Missouri